Ikatel is a telecommunications company of Mali, affiliated with France Telecom.  Since 2003 it has been Mali's second mobile phone operator.
Since November 30, 2006 Ikatel Became Orange Mali Faso djigui

External links
 Orange Mali 

Telecommunications companies of Mali